The al-Najm al-Thaqib (Arabic:النجم الثاقب, "piercing star") is a Yemeni missile system developed by the Houthis and revealed on 26 May 2015. The Houthis claimed that these missiles could violate the blockade imposed by UN resolution 2216 imposed by the Arab Coalition. American reports suggest that this missile was designed to attack nearby targets like Jizan without expending their diminishing stock of longer range missiles. It is somewhat similar to Iranian Oghab missiles, however it lacks fins. All civil airports in Jizan, Asir and Najran have been closed due to the risk of missile strikes since July 2015.

Characteristics

Al-Najm al-Thaqib 1
Al-Najm al-Thaqib 1 has a range of 45 km and a warhead of 50 kg explosive.

Al-Najm al-Thaqib 2
Al-Najm al-Thaqib 2 has a range of 75 km and a warhead of 75 kg explosive.

References 

Rocket artillery
Ballistic missiles
Tactical ballistic missiles
Tactical ballistic missiles of Yemen
Surface-to-surface missiles
Surface-to-surface missiles of Yemen
Ballistic missiles of Yemen
Guided missiles of Yemen
Theatre ballistic missiles